Fearful Symmetry is a phrase from William Blake's poem "The Tyger" (Tyger, tyger, burning bright / In the forests of the night, / What immortal hand or eye / Could frame thy fearful symmetry?). It has been used as the name of a number of other works:

Film and television 
"Fearful Symmetry" (The X-Files), an episode of The X-Files
"Fearful Symmetry", an episode of the animated television series Justice League Unlimited
Fearful Symmetry, a 1998 documentary on the making of To Kill a Mockingbird
"Fearful Symmetry", an episode of the television series Lewis
"Fearful Symmetry", a 2011 episode of the television series Endgame
 "Red Sky in the Morning", a 2010 episode of the television series The Mentalist, see The Mentalist (season 2)
 "Fearful Symmetry," a 2020 episode of the tabletop role-playing series Dimension 20, in its Fantasy High: Sophomore Year season
 "Fearful Symmetry" is the password to enter Tiger Bar in "The Russians? Exactly, the Soviets.", an episode of Neo Yokio

Music  
 Fearful Symmetry (album), a 1986 album by Daniel Amos
 Fearful Symmetry, a band headed by Jimmy P. Brown II of Deliverance
 "Fearful Symmetries", a composition by John Adams
 "Fearful Symmetry", a 1990 album by Box of Chocolates, a group that included Will Oldham

Print 
Fearful Symmetry, a book by mathematician Ian Stewart
Fearful Symmetry (Frye), a work of Blake scholarship by Northrop Frye
Fearful Symmetry, a popular science book by physicist Anthony Zee
Fearful Symmetry, a 2008 novel in the Star Trek: Deep Space Nine relaunch series
Fearful Symmetry, the fifth issue of the comic book Watchmen by Alan Moore
Fearful Symmetry, an alternate title for the Spider-Man graphic novel Kraven's Last Hunt
Fearful Symmetry, a short story by Sherman Alexie, included in his book War Dances
Fearful Symmetries, a novel by S. Andrew Swann
Her Fearful Symmetry, a novel by Audrey Niffenegger

Other 
"Fearful Symmetry", a difficult ice climb in the Canadian Rockies
FearfulSymmetry.net, the website of novelist Dan Wells
"Thy Fearful Symmetry", a universal helmet ornament in Destiny 2

See also 
Her Fearful Symmetry, a novel by Audrey Niffenegger